KXIO is a radio station airing a country music format licensed to Clarksville, Arkansas, broadcasting on 106.9 MHz FM. The station is owned by EAB of Clarksville, LLC.

On March 3, 2017, KXIO changed their format from classic rock to country, branded as "KIC 106.9". (info taken from stationintel.com)

Previous logo

References

External links

Country radio stations in the United States
XIO
Radio stations established in 1992
1992 establishments in Arkansas